Elections for the London Borough of Merton were held on 8 May 1986 to elect members of Merton London Borough Council in London, England. This was on the same day as other local elections in England and Scotland.

The whole council was up for election and the incumbent majority Conservative administration remained in overall control of the council, its majority reduced to one seat.

Background
At the last election, the Conservatives had remained in overall majority control of the council, winning 44 seats. The Labour Party was returned as the only opposition party, with 13 seats. In the same election, Longthornton and Tamworth Residents Association lost all their three seats to the Conservatives.

Following the death of Cllr. Michael Page, at a by-election in Longthornton on 15 March 1984, the Longthornton and Tamworth Residents Association regained one of their seats from the Conservatives.

Results

In Durnsford, future Prime Minister Theresa May was first elected to public office, holding the seat for the Conservative Party and beating Tony Colman, the future Labour MP for Putney, who also later led Merton Council between 1991 and 1997.

Ward Results

Durnsford

Notes and references
Notes

References

1986
1986 London Borough council elections